James Hawley "Jim" Hunt (born July 25, 1936, in Boston, Massachusetts) is an American sailor and Olympic Champion. He competed at the 1960 Summer Olympics in Rome and won a gold medal in the 5.5 metre class, with the boat Minotaur, designed by his father, C. Raymond Hunt.

References

External links
 
 
 

1936 births
Living people
American male sailors (sport)
Olympic gold medalists for the United States in sailing
Sailors at the 1960 Summer Olympics – 5.5 Metre
Medalists at the 1960 Summer Olympics